Megabasis speculifera is a species of longhorn beetles, the sole member of the genus, Megabasis and the tribe Megabasini of the subfamily Lamiinae.

References

Lamiinae
Monotypic Cerambycidae genera